Sonja Stanek is an Austrian former competitive figure skater. She is the 1978 Blue Swords silver medalist, 1979 Karl Schäfer Memorial silver medalist, and 1983 Austrian national champion. She competed at multiple ISU Championships, finishing in the top ten at the 1983 European Championships in Dortmund. Her best world result, 14th, came at the 1983 World Championships in Helsinki.

Competitive highlights

References 

Austrian female single skaters
Living people
Year of birth missing (living people)